Mount Assisi School, is an English Medium School located at Bhagalpur, Bihar, India. It is affiliated to CISCE. It was established in 1972 by Franciscan friars (Third Order Regular of St. Francis).

It is considered to be one of the premiere institutions in Bihar by various measures of education excellence such as academic reputation, co-curricular education, teacher welfare and development, competence of faculty, co-curricular activities, sports education, individual attention to students, life skills, infrastructure provision, and leadership/management quality.

The school started on the premises of Franciscan Ashram in the heart of Bhagalpur Town, in the vicinity of the general post office (Badi post office). (Note that the only missionary school, at that time, in Bhagalpur, was the co-educational Mount Carmel School).

Principals including Fr. Louis K, Fr. Job TOR, Fr. Jose Chaklakal TOR, Fr. Jose Thottunkal TOR, and Fr. Thomas Chhitokulam TOR made the school what it is today. With the vision of Fr. Jose Chaklakal TOR, a new campus was created in the mid 1980s. The school was split into Junior Section (Nursery to Class V), which is located near Badi post office, and the new Senior Section (Class Nursery onwards) on the new campus. The campus was built east of Bhagalpur Town in the vicinity of Ranitalab and the Bhagalpur Engineering College.  In 2012, a new building for the +1 and +2 students was built with a large auditorium.

In the late 1980s girls were allowed in and a co-educational school was born. In 1992 the Plus Two wing was built, initially for a Science Wing and was co-educational. Fr. Jose Thottunkal TOR and Fr. Thomas Chittokulam TOR, then Principal and Vice Principal were in charge.

The school is equipped with a basketball court, a volleyball court, a tennis court, a games field, an athletic field and a large auditorium for parents and children day celebration, a large hall, a modern computer lab, and science labs.  The school also has a permanent stadium with seating capacity around 1500. The school library has a collection of books for students. The school has a history of high scores for both Class 10 as well as +2 students. The school holds medical camps from time to time for underprivileged members of society, in conjunction with the school alumni group.

Mount Assisi School is one of the few institutions in Bihar with a continuous running school magazine, printed nearly every academic year, named "MASCO".  It allows the students to hone their literary skills with articles selected by the editorial board in both English and Hindi.

The students in the school are divided into four houses:

Each house competes in competitions throughout the year, such as quiz, dance, and music (instrumental as well as vocal).  There are also sports tournaments, including cricket, volleyball, football, kho-kho tournament, and basketball.

The school has a yearly picnic for the students, held at places of historical importance as well as mythological places.

The school also holds special events each year:  sports day, parents' day, exhibitions, etc.

'For God and Country' is the motto of the school.

Alumni

Class 12th Humanities

2017 Marks

 Aparajita Singh and Pushkar Jaiswal  -  92.80%
 Pragya  -  92.60%

In the year 2019, Tilak Bharadwaj of Humanities Stream scored 98.75% in the  CISCE class 12th examinations  under best of four subjects (English + 3 subjects) system and 98.80% overall. His marks were the second highest in the state.

The following year (2020), Anima Singh went on to score 99.25%, becoming the district topper.

2021 was a special year as the board exams were cancelled due to the second wave of COVID-19 outbreak. The results were based on a special formula derived by the council using the marks of internals, class 10, projects, viva and other evaluations conducted throughout the two years. The rank list declared was as follows:-

 Vighnesh Mishra  -  98.50% (District Topper and 3rd Rank In Bihar)
 Komal  -  97.75%
 Tripti Raj  -  97.50%
 Rocky  -  97.00%
 Rimjhim Mishra  -  96.50%
Nidhi Soni  -  96.50%

Class 12th Commerce

2021 Marks (English + Best 3)

 Drishti Jain - 96.75%
 Vaibhav Chaudhary - 94.25%
 Kavya Bhushan - 93.50%
 Anjali Tewary - 93.00%
 
 Ayush Kumar Singh - 92.25%

Class 12th Science

In 2016, Shruti Priya scored 97.75% to secure first rank in the state.

2017 Marks

 Abhilasha More  -  97.00%
 Bhavna Bharti  -  95.20%

2021 Marks (English + Best 3)

 Ankesh Gupta - 99.75%
 Arjun Anand Roy - 99.00%
 Yashraj Kumar Singh - 98.00%
 Kumar Utsav - 97.75%
 Aarushi Shanker - 96.75%

Class 10th

Co-curricular activities

The school was a winner in the 2018 CCCC 6.0 city round organised by Extra-C held at Inter Stariya Zila School. The school was represented by Tilak Bhardwaj and Adya Sakshi. The competition was held on 23 July 2018.

The school represented by Vighnesh Mishra & Shashank Shekhar went on to win the 2019 CCCC 7.0 Bhagalpur city round held on 7 August 2019. It was the second successive victory in the competition.

The school won a state level 2nd Runners-Up in 2022 FIT India Quiz conducted under the Aazadi ka Amrit Mohatsav initiative. The school was represented by Abhijeet Kumar and Kumar Aditya in the competition which spanned from November 2021 to August 2022.

References

External links
Official School website
Official Alumni website

Franciscan education
Catholic schools in India
Private schools in Bihar
Christian schools in Bihar
Education in Bhagalpur district
Bhagalpur
Educational institutions established in 1972
1972 establishments in Bihar